Manapparai is a state assembly constituency in Tiruchirappalli district of Tamil Nadu, India newly formed after constituency delimitation 2008. Its State Assembly Constituency number is 138. It is included in Karur Lok Sabha constituency for lok sabha elections. It is one of the 234 State Legislative Assembly Constituencies in Tamil Nadu in India.

Members of Legislative Assembly

Election results

2021

2016

2011

1962

1957

1952

References 

Assembly constituencies of Tamil Nadu